HaMakhtesh HaKatan (lit. The Small Crater) or simply Makhtesh HaKatan or Makhtesh Katan, is a makhtesh, a geological erosional landform, situated in Israel's Negev desert. At 5 km by 7 km, it is the third largest of the five makhteshim in the Negev, from a total of seven known major makhteshim, of which two are in Egypt's Sinai desert. It was charted in 1942 by Jewish explorers.

See also
Makhtesh Ramon

Erosion landforms
Landforms of Israel
Geography of Southern District (Israel)